Duncan Church, also known as Saint Placidus Catholic Church, is a historic church near Gann Valley, South Dakota. It was built in 1927 and was added to the National Register in 1999.

It has clapboard siding and a gable roof.

References

Churches in the Roman Catholic Diocese of Sioux Falls
Former Roman Catholic church buildings in South Dakota
Churches on the National Register of Historic Places in South Dakota
Roman Catholic churches completed in 1927
Buildings and structures in Buffalo County, South Dakota
National Register of Historic Places in Buffalo County, South Dakota
20th-century Roman Catholic church buildings in the United States